There are at least 18 large mammal and 103 small mammal species known to occur in Wyoming.

Species are listed by common name, scientific name, typical habitat and occurrence. The common and scientific names come from the American Society of Mammalogists' Wyoming Mammal List.

Large and medium sized mammals

Grizzly bear
Order: Carnivora, Family: Ursidae

Black bear

Order: Carnivora, Family: Ursidae

Occurrence: Forests, slide areas, alpine meadows

The American black bear (Ursus americanus) is North America's smallest and most common species of bear. It is a generalist animal, being able to exploit numerous different habitats and foodstuffs. The American black bear is listed by the IUCN as being of least concern, due to the species widespread distribution and a large global population estimated to be twice that of all other bear species combined.

Bighorn sheep
Order: Artiodactyla, Family: Bovidae

Occurrence: Open mountainous areas

The bighorn sheep (Ovis canadensis) is a species of sheep in North America with large horns.

American bison

Order: Artiodactyla, Family: Bovidae

Occurrence: Eastside parklands and prairies

The American bison (Bison bison) is a North American species of bison, also commonly known as the American buffalo. These bison once roamed the grasslands of North America in massive herds; their range roughly formed a triangle between the Great Bear Lake in Canada's far northwest, south to the Mexican states of Durango and Nuevo León, and east along the western boundary of the Appalachian Mountains. Today these bison are much fewer in number, and travel only in small herds.

In 1985, the American bison was declared the state mammal of Wyoming.

Bobcat
Order: Carnivora, Family: Felidae

Occurrence: Open forests, brushy areas

The bobcat (Lynx rufus) is a North American mammal of the cat family, Felidae. With twelve recognized subspecies, it ranges from southern Canada to northern Mexico, including most of the continental United States. The bobcat is an adaptable predator that inhabits wooded areas, as well as semi-desert, urban edge, forest edges and swampland environments. It persists in much of its original range and populations are healthy.

Coyote

Order: Carnivora, Family: Canidae

Occurrence: Forests, grasslands

The coyote ( or ) (Canis latrans), also known as the American jackal or the prairie wolf, is a species of canid found throughout North and Central America, ranging from Panama in the south, north through Mexico, the United States and Canada. It occurs as far north as Alaska and all but the northernmost portions of Canada.

Elk

Order: Artiodactyla, Family: Cervidae

Occurrence: Open forests, meadows, fields

The elk or wapiti (Cervus canadensis) is one of the largest species of deer in the world and one of the largest mammals in North America and eastern Asia. In the deer family (Cervidae), only the moose, Alces alces (called an "elk" in Europe), is larger, and Cervus unicolor (the sambar deer) can rival the C. canadensis elk in size. Elk range in forest and forest-edge habitat, feeding on grasses, plants, leaves, and bark.

Gray fox
Order: Carnivora, Family: Canidae

Occurrence: Deciduous forests, cottonwood riparian, basin-prairie shrublands, sagebrush-grasslands, riparian shrub,
grasslands, agricultural areas, rock outcrops, roadside/railroad banks.

The gray fox (Urocyon cinereoargenteus) ranges throughout most of the southern half of North America from southern Canada to the northern part of South America (Venezuela and Colombia).

Gray wolf

Order: Carnivora, Family: Canidae

Occurrence: Coniferous forests

The gray wolf (Canis lupus), often known simply as the wolf, is the largest wild member of the family Canidae. It is an ice age survivor originating during the Late Pleistocene around 300,000 years ago. DNA sequencing and genetic drift studies reaffirm that the gray wolf shares a common ancestry with the domestic dog (Canis lupus familiaris). Although certain aspects of this conclusion have been questioned, the main body of evidence confirms it. A number of other gray wolf subspecies have been identified, though the actual number of subspecies is still open to discussion. Gray wolves are typically apex predators in the ecosystems they occupy.

Canada lynx
Order: Carnivora, Family: Felidae

Occurrence: Coniferous forests

The Canada lynx (Lynx canadensis) is a North American mammal of the cat family, Felidae. It is a close relative of the Eurasian lynx (Lynx lynx). Some authorities regard both as conspecific. However, in some characteristics the Canadian lynx is more like the bobcat (Lynx rufus) than the Eurasian lynx. With the recognized subspecies, it ranges across Canada and into Alaska as well as some parts of the northern United States.

Moose

Order: Artiodactyla, Family: Cervidae

Occurrence: Coniferous forests, lakes, slow streams, marshy areas

The moose (North America) or common European elk (Europe) (Alces alces) is the largest extant species in the deer family. Moose are distinguished by the palmate antlers of the males; other members of the family have antlers with a "twig-like" configuration. Moose typically inhabit boreal and mixed deciduous forests of the Northern Hemisphere in temperate to subarctic climates.

Mountain goat

Order: Artiodactyla, Family: Bovidae

Occurrence: High peaks and meadows

The mountain goat (Oreamnos americanus), also known as the Rocky Mountain goat, is a large-hoofed mammal found only in North America. Despite its vernacular name, it is not a member of Capra, the genus of true goats. It resides at high elevations and is a sure-footed climber, often resting on rocky cliffs that predators cannot reach. It has been introduced.

Mountain lion
Order: Carnivora, Family: Felidae

Occurrence: Coniferous forests

The cougar (Puma concolor), also known as puma, mountain lion, mountain cat, catamount or panther, depending on the region, is a mammal of the family Felidae, native to the Americas. This large, solitary cat has the greatest range of any large wild terrestrial mammal in the Western Hemisphere, extending from Yukon in Canada to the southern Andes of South America. An adaptable, generalist species, the cougar is found in every major American habitat type. It is the second heaviest cat in the American continents after the jaguar. Although large, the cougar is most closely related to smaller felines.

Mule deer

Order: Artiodactyla, Family: Cervidae

Occurrence: Open forests, meadows, often at high elevations

The mule deer (Odocoileus hemionus) is a deer whose habitat is in the western half of North America. It gets its name from its large mule-like ears. Adult male mule deer are called bucks, adult females are called does, and young of both sexes are called fawns. The black-tailed deer is considered by some a distinct species though it is classified as a subspecies of the mule deer. Unlike its cousin, the white-tailed deer, mule deer are generally more associated with the land west of the Missouri River. The most noticeable differences between whitetails and mule deer are the color of their tails and configuration of their antlers. The mule deer's tail is black tipped.

Pronghorn
Order: Artiodactyla, Family: Antilocapridae

Occurrence: Basin-prairie and mountain-foothills, shrublands, eastern great plains and great basin-foothills grasslands, sagebrush-grasslands

The pronghorn (Antilocapra americana), is a species of artiodactyl mammal native to interior western and central North America. Though not a true antelope, it is often known colloquially in North America as the prong buck, pronghorn antelope or simply antelope, as it closely resembles the true antelopes of the Old World and fills a similar ecological niche due to convergent evolution. It is the only surviving member of the family Antilocapridae.

Red fox

Order: Carnivora, Family: Canidae

Occurrence: Grasslands, open forest

The red fox (Vulpes vulpes) is a small canid native to much of North America and Eurasia, as well as northern Africa. It is the most recognizable species of fox and in many areas it is referred to simply as "the fox". As its name suggests, its fur is predominantly reddish brown, but there is a naturally occurring gray morph known as the "silver" fox. The red fox is by far the most widespread and abundant species of fox, found in almost every single habitat in the Northern Hemisphere, from the coastal marshes of United States, to the alpine tundras of Tibetan Plateau.

Swift fox

Order: Carnivora, Family: Canidae

Occurrence: Short-grass prairies and deserts

The swift fox (Vulpes velox) is a small light orange-tan fox around the size of a domestic cat found in the western grasslands of North America, such as Colorado, New Mexico and Texas. It also lives in Manitoba, Saskatchewan and Alberta in Canada, where it was previously extirpated. It is closely related to the kit fox and the two species are sometimes known as subspecies of Vulpes velox because hybrids of the two species occur naturally where their ranges overlap.

The swift fox lives primarily in short-grass prairies and deserts. Due to predator control programs in the 1930s, it was considered extinct in Canada for some time, but reintroduction programs have been successful in reintroducing the species. Due to stable populations elsewhere, the species is considered by the IUCN to be of least concern.

White-tailed deer

Order: Artiodactyla, Family: Cervidae

Occurrence: Coniferous forests, meadows, creek and river bottoms

The white-tailed deer (Odocoileus virginianus), also known as the Virginia deer, or simply as the whitetail, is a medium-sized deer native to the United States (all but five of the states), Canada, Mexico, Central America, and in South America as far south as Peru. The species is most common east of the Rocky Mountains, and is absent from much of the western United States, including Nevada, Utah, California, Hawaii, and Alaska (though its close relatives, the mule deer and black-tailed deer, can be found there). It does, however, survive in aspen parklands and deciduous river bottomlands within the central and northern Great Plains, and in mixed deciduous riparian corridors, river valley bottomlands, and lower foothills of the northern Rocky Mountain regions from Wyoming to southeastern British Columbia.

Small mammals

Procyonids
From the Atlas of Birds, Mammals, Amphibians, and Reptiles in Wyoming:

Order: Carnivora, Family: Procyonidae

Ringtail, Bassariscus astutus
Raccoon, Procyon lotor, open forests, stream bottoms

Badgers and weasels
From the Atlas of Birds, Mammals, Amphibians, and Reptiles in Wyoming:

Order: Carnivora, Family: Mustelidae

Wolverine, Gulo gulo, coniferous forests and alpine meadows
North American river otter, Lontra canadensis, rivers, lakes, ponds
Pacific marten, Martes caurina, coniferous forests
Black-footed ferret, Mustela nigripes
Least weasel, Mustela nivalis, open forests and grasslands
American ermine, Mustela richardsonii, coniferous forests and meadows
Long-tailed weasel, Neogale frenata, open forests and meadows
American mink, Neogale vison, creek and lake edges
Fisher, Pekania pennanti, coniferous forests
American badger, Taxidea taxus, grasslands

Skunks
From the Atlas of Birds, Mammals, Amphibians, and Reptiles in Wyoming:

Order: Carnivora, Family: Mephitidae

 Striped skunk, Mephitis mephitis, open forests and grasslands
 Western spotted skunk, Spilogale gracilis
 Eastern spotted skunk, Spilogale putorius

Hares and rabbits
From the Atlas of Birds, Mammals, Amphibians, and Reptiles in Wyoming:

Order: Lagomorpha, Family: Leporidae

 Pygmy rabbit, Brachylagus idahoensis
 Snowshoe hare, Lepus americanus, coniferous forests
 Black-tailed jackrabbit, Lepus californicus
 White-tailed jackrabbit, Lepus townsendii, grasslands
 Desert cottontail, Sylvilagus audubonii
 Eastern cottontail, Sylvilagus floridanus
 Mountain cottontail, Sylvilagus nuttallii, forests, brushy areas

Pikas
From the Atlas of Birds, Mammals, Amphibians, and Reptiles in Wyoming:

Order: Lagomorpha, Family: Ochotonidae

American pika, Ochotona princeps, rocky slopes

Shrews
From the Atlas of Birds, Mammals, Amphibians, and Reptiles in Wyoming:

Order: Eulipotyphla, Family: Soricidae

 Masked shrew, Sorex cinereus, coniferous forests, meadows, ponds and stream edges
 Hayden's shrew, Sorex haydeni
 Pygmy shrew, Sorex hoyi, dry open coniferous forests
 Merriam's shrew, Sorex merriami
 Dusky shrew, Sorex monticolus, higher elevation coniferous forests
 Dwarf shrew, Sorex nanus
 American water shrew, Sorex palustris, stream edges
 Preble's shrew, Sorex preblei
 Vagrant shrew, Sorex vagrans, moist forests and grasslands, marsh and stream edges

Beaver
From the Atlas of Birds, Mammals, Amphibians, and Reptiles in Wyoming:

Order: Rodentia, Family: Castoridae

 Beaver, Castor canadensis, ponds, streams, lakes

Squirrels
From the Atlas of Birds, Mammals, Amphibians, and Reptiles in Wyoming:

Order: Rodentia, Family: Sciuridae

 White-tailed prairie dog, Cynomys leucurus
 Black-tailed prairie dog, Cynomys ludovicianus
 Northern flying squirrel, Glaucomys sabrinus, coniferous forests, nocturnal
 Yellow-bellied marmot, Marmota flaviventris, open rocky foothills, talus slopes
 Abert's squirrel, Sciurus aberti
 Eastern fox squirrel, Sciurus niger
 Uinta ground squirrel, Spermophilus armatus
 Wyoming ground squirrel, Spermophilus elegans
 Golden-mantled ground squirrel, Spermophilus lateralis, high open forests, rocky areas
 Spotted ground squirrel, Spermophilus spilosoma
 Thirteen-lined ground squirrel, Spermophilus tridecemlineatus, grasslands
 Yellow-pine chipmunk, Tamias amoenus, open forests, brushy, rocky areas
 Cliff chipmunk, Tamias dorsalis
 Least chipmunk, Tamias minimus, high open forests, brushy, rocky areas, alpine meadows
 Uinta chipmunk, Tamias umbrinus
 Red squirrel, Tamiasciurus hudsonicus

Pocket mice and kangaroo rats

From the Atlas of Birds, Mammals, Amphibians, and Reptiles in Wyoming:

Order: Rodentia, Family: Heteromyidae

 Plains pocket mouse, Perognathus flavescens
 Great Basin pocket mouse, Perognathus parvus
 Hispid pocket mouse, Chaetodipus hispidus
 Olive-backed pocket mouse, Perognathus fasciatus
 Ord's kangaroo rat, Dipodomys ordii
 Silky pocket mouse, Perognathus flavus

Pocket gophers
From the Atlas of Birds, Mammals, Amphibians, and Reptiles in Wyoming:

Order: Rodentia, Family: Geomyidae

 Northern pocket gopher, Thomomys talpoides, meadows
 Idaho pocket gopher, Thomomys idahoensis
 Wyoming pocket gopher, Thomomys clusius
 Plains pocket gopher, Geomys bursarius

Mice
From the Atlas of Birds, Mammals, Amphibians, and Reptiles in Wyoming:

Order: Rodentia, Family: Cricetidae

 Western deer mouse, Peromyscus sonoriensis, forests, grasslands, alpine meadows
 Northern grasshopper mouse, Onychomys leucogaster
 Western harvest mouse, Reithrodontomys megalotis
 Plains harvest mouse, Reithrodontomys montanus
 White-footed mouse, Peromyscus leucopus
 Pinyon mouse, Peromyscus truei
 Canyon mouse, Peromyscus crinitus

Jumping mice
From the Atlas of Birds, Mammals, Amphibians, and Reptiles in Wyoming:

Order: Rodentia, Family: Dipodidae

 Western jumping mouse, Zapus princeps, grasslands, alpine meadows
 Meadow jumping mouse, Zapus hudsonius

Muskrats, voles and woodrats
From the Atlas of Birds, Mammals, Amphibians, and Reptiles in Wyoming:

Order: Rodentia, Family: Cricetidae

 Muskrat, Ondatra zibethicus, streams, lakes, marshy areas
 Heather vole, Phenacomys intermedius, coniferous forests, alpine meadows
 Long-tailed vole, Microtus longicaudus, coniferous forests, grasslands
 Meadow vole, Microtus pennsylvanicus, open forests, meadows, along streams, marshy areas
 Southern red-backed vole, Clethrionomys gapperi, coniferous forests
 Water vole, Microtus richardsoni, high elevation stream and lake edges
 Montane vole, Microtus montanus
 Prairie vole, Microtus ochrogaster
 Sagebrush vole, Lemmiscus curtatus
 Bushy-tailed woodrat, Neotoma cinerea, rocky areas, old buildings

Porcupines
Order: Rodentia, Family: Erethizontidae

 North American porcupine, Erethizon dorsatum, coniferous forests

Bats
From the Atlas of Birds, Mammals, Amphibians, and Reptiles in Wyoming:

Order: Chiroptera, Family: Vespertilionidae

 Big brown bat, Eptesicus fuscus, coniferous forests, often around buildings, caves
 Hoary bat, Lasiurus cinereus, coniferous forests, mostly nocturnal
 Little brown bat, Myotis lucifugus, coniferous forests, often around buildings, caves, nocturnal
 Long-eared myotis, Myotis evotis, coniferous forests, meadows, nocturnal
 Long-legged bat, Myotis volans, coniferous forests, meadows, nocturnal
 Silver-haired bat, Lasionycteris noctivagans, coniferous forests, meadows, nocturnal
 California myotis, Myotis californicus
 Eastern red bat, Lasiurus borealis
 Fringed myotis, Myotis thysanodes
 Northern myotis, Myotis septentrionalis
 Pallid bat, Antrozous pallidus
 Spotted bat, Euderma maculatum
 Townsend's big-eared bat, Corynorhinus townsendii
 Western small-footed myotis, Myotis ciliolabrum
 Yuma myotis, Myotis yumanensis
 Eastern pipistrelle, Pipistrellus subflavus
 Brazilian free-tailed bat, Tadarida brasiliensis
 Big free-tailed bat, Nyctinomops macrotis

Exotic species, not native to Wyoming

Small mammals
 Eastern gray squirrel, Sciurus carolinensis
 Virginia opossum, Didelphis virginiana
 House mouse, Mus musculus
 Norway rat, Rattus norvegicus

See also
 Amphibians and reptiles of Wyoming
 List of birds of Wyoming

Further reading

Notes

Mammals
Wyoming